Acko General Insurance is a private sector general insurance company in India. Founded in November 2016, the company received its license from the Insurance Regulatory and Development Authority of India (IRDAI) in September 2017. Acko follows an online-led model and hence all operations for the company are offered through the digital platform.

History
Acko General Insurance was founded by Varun Dua, who serves as the Chief Executive Officer. As of 2018, Acko has raised ₹274 crore ($42 million) in funding from investors such as Amazon, Accel Partners, SAIF Partners, Catamaran Ventures. The retail products offered by Acko General Insurance include motor insurance, in-trip domestic insurance  and mobile insurance.

Partnerships
 Acko General Insurance partnered with Ola cabs and launched an in-trip insurance program in more than 110 cities in India.
 Acko General Insurance partnered with Amazon India to provide mobile insurance plans on the retailer's website.
Acko General Insurance partnered with HDB Financial Services and offer HDBFS customers insurance covers at no additional cost with EMI cards.
 In July 2020, Amazon Pay partnered with Acko to provide its customers auto insurance policy.

References

External links
 

Financial services companies established in 2016
Online companies of India
Privately held companies of India
Online insurance companies
Insurance companies of India